Kevin Broderick (born 20 May 1977) is an Irish hurler. He plays for his local club Tynagh-Abbey/Duniry and with the Galway senior inter-county team.

References

External links
 Kevin Broderick on Hurlingstats.com
 Galway GAA honours

1977 births
Living people
Galway inter-county hurlers
Tynagh-Abbey/Duniry hurlers